East Orange is an active commuter railroad train station in the city of East Orange, Essex County, New Jersey. Located next to East Orange City Hall, the station serves trains on the two lines that make up New Jersey Transit's Morris and Essex Lines: the Morristown Line and Gladstone Branch. Trains heading east to New York Penn Station and Hoboken Terminal stop at Newark Broad Street Station next, while trains heading west towards Gladstone and Hackettstown stop at Brick Church station. East Orange station contains two platforms (one side platform and one island platform) to service three active tracks. The station is accessible for handicapped persons per the Americans with Disabilities Act of 1990. 

Service in East Orange began on November 19, 1836 when the Morris and Essex Railroad opened to Orange. Originally the station was known as Orange Junction as the name East Orange was assigned to the now-closed Grove Street station to the east. The current station at the location opened on December 18, 1922 when the Delaware, Lackawanna and Western Railroad completed an elevation project of the tracks through the city. The headhouse at East Orange station were added to the New Jersey and National Registers of Historic Places in 1984 as part of the Operating Passenger Railroad Stations Thematic Resource.

History
Station owner New Jersey Transit decided to perform work at East Orange station to improve accessibility for the handicapped and to repair eighty-year-old viaducts at the station. At a cost of $22.9 million, repair work at East Orange, along with nearby station Brick Church commenced in 2004.  East Orange received a mini-high level platform, the tracks surrounding the station were upgraded with concrete ties and the stairways leading to the platforms were replaced.

Station layout
The station has two low-level platforms serving all three tracks.

See also
List of New Jersey Transit stations

Bibliography

References

External links

East Orange, New Jersey
National Register of Historic Places in Essex County, New Jersey
NJ Transit Rail Operations stations
Railway stations in the United States opened in 1836
Railway stations on the National Register of Historic Places in New Jersey
Former Delaware, Lackawanna and Western Railroad stations
Railway stations in Essex County, New Jersey
1836 establishments in New Jersey